Raimundo Rafael Yant Rivas (born October 2, 1964) is a former Venezuelan boxer.

He competed for his native country at the 1992 Summer Olympics in Barcelona, Spain, where he was defeated in the first round of the Men's Light Heavyweight (– 81 kg) by Algeria's Mohamed Benguesmia (11:15). A year earlier he captured the silver medal in the same division at the 1991 Pan American Games.

References
Profile

1964 births
Living people
Light-heavyweight boxers
Olympic boxers of Venezuela
Boxers at the 1991 Pan American Games
Boxers at the 1992 Summer Olympics
Venezuelan male boxers
Pan American Games silver medalists for Venezuela
Pan American Games medalists in boxing
Competitors at the 1986 Central American and Caribbean Games
Competitors at the 1990 Central American and Caribbean Games
Central American and Caribbean Games silver medalists for Venezuela
Central American and Caribbean Games bronze medalists for Venezuela
Central American and Caribbean Games medalists in boxing
Medalists at the 1991 Pan American Games
20th-century Venezuelan people
21st-century Venezuelan people